Menton-Garavan is a railway station in Menton, Provence-Alpes-Côte d'Azur, France.

History

The station is located on the Marseille–Ventimiglia railway line. The station is served by TER (local) services operated by SNCF. Trains operate between Cannes and Ventimiglia roughly every 30 mins.

This is the last station before the border with Italy. As a result, during the 2015 influx of refugees in Europe, police executed a search for illegal immigrants on every train arriving from Italy.

Train services
The following services currently call at Menton-Garavan:
local service (TER Provence-Alpes-Côte-d'Azur) Grasse/Mandelieu - Cannes - Nice - Monaco - Ventimiglia

References

TER Provence-Alpes-Côte-d'Azur
Railway stations in Alpes-Maritimes